The 1885–86 season was the 13th season of competitive football in Scotland.

Honours

Cup honours

National

County

Other

Teams in F.A. Cup

Scotland national team

Notes

References

External links
Scottish Football Historical Archive

 
Seasons in Scottish football